Péter Kuczka (Székesfehérvár, Hungary, 1 March 1923 – Budapest, Hungary, 8 December 1999) was a Hungarian writer, poet and science fiction editor. He was also active as a comic writer.

After finishing high school, Kuczka studied at the University of Economy in Hungary while working several jobs. He started writing after the end of World War II and from 1940 was influential in Hungarian literature circles.

Kuczka's poetry was first printed in 1949 but after 1956 he was not allowed to publish his poetry due to his political views and local political changes. He got national prizes for his early literature in 1950 (József Attila prize) and 1954 (Kossuth Prize).

He was the editor of the Kozmosz Fantasztikus Könyvek (Cosmos Fantastic Books) series, whose books were the first science fiction books in Hungary.

He was the founder and editor of Galaktika, the third largest science fiction anthology in the world, which had a definitive influence on the evolution of Hungarian science fiction literature.

He was the editor of the publisher Móra Ferenc könyvkiadó from 1976.  Móra Ferenc könyvkiadó is a high-quality publisher that has helped the literary education of Hungarian children.

Criticism 

After World War II, Kuczka became a mouthpiece of the Communist Rákosi regime, as he put it, on a voluntary basis. He became a significant figure in contemporary Hungarian literature and culture dominated by the Communists. His poems were militant, direct, raw, often prose-wise, agitative poetry. As he wrote later: "I believed in Communism, I felt and knew more and more, I wanted to be a writer for the Party, serving the set goals. I had no doubt that with the full mastery and experience of Marxism-Leninism we could arrive at socialist realism, considered to be the pinnacle of literature. I believed in our results, our successes, because I worked for them and felt them. I accepted it because I considered it necessary to have a rhythmic applause, to glorify Stalin and Rákosi, I believed in the escalation of the class struggle, the Rajk trial. I accepted a simplified and thus more understandable and transparent world, the complexity of reality was obviously alarming, I saw the history of mankind as a kind of “long march” towards communism. I have suppressed my doubts, either discarded my previous views, opinions, knowledge, or incorporated them into my new worldview."

Science fiction writer István Nemere described Kuczka as being the state-installed overlord of Hungarian science fiction during the Kádár-era, and that writers who were not sympathetic to him could simply not get their works in print. Nemere accused him of setting throwbacks to his career in the early 1980s.

Translator and current Galaktika editor Attila Németh told that Kuczka hated the Star Trek franchise (apparently without a reason), and that's why it was almost completely neglected in Hungary during the Socialist era. Németh, a Star Trek fan later translated Trek novels to Hungarian, and served as translator and consultant on the Hungarian dubbed version of the Star Trek series and movies.

References

External links 
Kuczka Péter: éveken át, selections from 1942 to 1988
 Lambiek Comiclopedia article.

Hungarian science fiction writers
Hungarian speculative fiction critics
Hungarian male poets
Hungarian comics writers
1923 births
1999 deaths
20th-century Hungarian poets
20th-century Hungarian male writers